Kwati Candith Mashego-Dlamini is the current Deputy Minister of International Relations and Cooperation in South Africa, along with Mr Alvin Botes and has served as MEC for various Departments of The Mpumalanga Provincial Government under the Administrations of Thabang Makwetla and David Mabuza. She was moved to National Government after the 2014 General election.

See also

African Commission on Human and Peoples' Rights
Constitution of South Africa
History of the African National Congress
Politics in South Africa
Provincial governments of South Africa

References

Year of birth missing (living people)
Living people
21st-century South African politicians
African National Congress politicians
Members of the Mpumalanga Provincial Legislature
Members of the National Assembly of South Africa